Brenda Mader  (born 24 April 1986) is a Swiss Politician (up!, formerly FDP), formerly President of the Young Liberals (Switzerland)

Life 
Mäder grew up in Weinfelden, a town in Thurgau, Switzerland. 
After reaching the matura at the grammar school in Frauenfelden in 2004, she studied Business economics at the University of St. Gallen and attained a Bachelor's degree in 2007. During that time she spent a semester abroad at the University of Economics, Prague. In 2008 Brenda Mäder started her master studies at the University of St. Gallen and was awarded a Master's degree in April 2011. Between 2010 and 2011 she worked for the "Thurgauer Kantonalbank" in Weinfelden. Since January 2012 she's working as consultant in an international strategy consultancy.

Politics 
From 2008 to April 2011 she was member of the managing board of the Young Liberals (Switzerland) and Young Liberals Thurgau. In 2009 she became vice-president of the Young Liberals Switzerland. In February 2010 to April 2012 she was president of the Young Liberals Switzerland. At the same time Mäder was also member of the party executive committee for FDP Switzerland and for FDP Thurgau.

She was a candidate for the National Council (Switzerland) in 2011 Swiss federal election. In 2012 Mäder was a candidate for the Grand Council of Thurgau and got the first replacement place for the FDP in the Weinfelden District.

Independence party up! (Unabhängigkeitspartei up!) 
Together with Simon Scherrer (President of the Young Liberals City St. Gallen) and Silvan Amberg (former president of the LGBT organisation within FDP) from Zurich, Mäder is founding a national independence party called "up!". The aim of its party is more individual freedom and less government involvement in individuals' lives. Mäder doesn't agree with some of the opinions of the FDP and thinks that her old party isn't radical enough. This lead her to found the new independence party up!.

Mäder is leading the party together with Silvan Amberg. The independence party was established on 18 June 2014 in Zurich. Expansions to the cantons of Thurgau, St. Gallen and Zurich have launched the party's campaigning and work.

References

External links 
 Website von Brenda Mäder
 Brenda Mäder: «Politik macht Spass», Coopzeitung 20 April 2010 (German)
 Brenda Mäders Blog at Vimentis (German)
 Thurgauerin Brenda Mäder gründet neue Partei, 20 Minuten  13 June 2014 (German)
 Mäder gründet eine neue Partei, Tagblatt 13 June 2014 (German)
 neue Partei im Thurgau und in St. Gallen, SRF 13 June 2014 (German)
 Wir sind eine Minimal-Staat-Partei, 20 Minuten 14 June 2014 (German)
 Die UpWeichlerin, Tagesanzeiger, 14 June 2014 (German)

1986 births
Living people
University of St. Gallen alumni
21st-century Swiss women politicians
21st-century Swiss politicians
People from Weinfelden